Alleyn's School is a 4–18 co-educational, private, Church of England, day school and sixth form in Dulwich, London, England. It is a registered charity and was originally part of Edward Alleyn's College of God's Gift charitable foundation, which also included James Allen's Girls' School (JAGS) and Dulwich College.

It has been a member school of the Headmasters' and Headmistresses' Conference since 1919.

History

Edward Alleyn

In 1619, Edward Alleyn established his 'College of God's Gift' (the gift of love) with twelve poor scholars.

Alleyn's School is a direct descendant of Edward Alleyn's original foundation and was established as a boys' school in 1882. It still exists as part of a foundation alongside Dulwich College and JAGS; 
For the original College of God's Gift, 24 students had to be chosen from the four parishes with which Edward Alleyn had been connected. Saint Giles, Camberwell (in which Dulwich was situated), Saint Saviour, Southwark (where the Bear Pit stood on Bankside), Saint Botolph, Bishopsgate (where Alleyn was born), and Saint Giles, Cripplegate (home to the Fortune Theatre).
Alleyn's became a public school with the election of the Headmaster to the Headmasters' Conference (HMC) in 1919.

The Lower School
The 1857 Act for confirming a Scheme of the Charity Commissioners for the College of God's Gift in Dulwich in the County of Surrey, also known as the Dulwich College Act, mandated that the College of God's Gift be separated into  an "Upper School", which became Dulwich College, and a "Lower School" which became Alleyn's. It was redone in 2018 to provide extra classrooms, an assembly room and a play area.

Separation from the College of God's Gift

In 1882, the upper school moved to a new site further south and the lower school stayed put, becoming an independent boys' school.

In 1887 it moved to its own site, where the school currently stands. The original school is now the foundation chapel and the offices for the Dulwich Estate, which belongs to the foundation schools.

Independence and co-education
It was one of 179 direct grant grammar schools from 1958 until the abolition of that status in 1976; at which point the school was still boys-only. The Governors then opted for outright independence and co-education; Chairman Lord Wolfenden explained the decision in the House of Lords on 12 November 1975:
As a responsible body of Governors, we were confronted with an extremely difficult decision. The dilemma is this. Should we, as the phrase goes, "take our place within the pattern of the local education authority", or should we, on the other hand, go independent? In relation to the former of those alternatives, there are two relevant considerations. The first is whether the past history and present nature of a school fits in with the overall structure of the pattern of the local education authority for children in the Dulwich area. The answer is that it clearly does not. A long-established grammar school, annually recruited to carry out what has for long been recognised by a substantial number of LEAs as its specific academic purpose, does not easily transform itself overnight into a comprehensive school to serve a limited catchment area. Even if it could do that, with extraordinary metamorphoses of staff and objectives, there is no evidence whatever that any local education authority would be prepared to absorb it. So the dilemma is resolved, your Lordships may say. Yes, but at what cost? Alleyn's School has no option, whatever its wishes might have been, but to go independent.Doctrines and ideologies apart, what does this mean in real life? It means that there will now be in Dulwich two independent day grammar schools, one of 1,300 boys and the other of 800 boys, within a couple of miles of each other. It also means that in order to maintain Alleyn's as an independent school its fees, with the removal of direct grant, will have to be put up to something like those of its consistently independent neighbour, Dulwich College. What sense does it make to have over 2,000 places in independent boys' grammar schools, at independent school fees, in one district of South London? We, the Governors of Alleyn's 1847 School think it makes no sense at all, so we are intending to make Alleyn's into a co-educational school. Then, in the Dulwich area, there will be an independent boys' school, Dulwich College, an independent girls' school, James Allen's School, and an independent coeducational school, Alleyn's.

Development

Alleyn's started developing a new theatre complex, named the Edward Alleyn Building, on 10 February 2007. The £8.5million building was completed in 2008 and had a Grand Gala Opening in 2009.

Extra-curricular activities
The school has one of the largest Combined Cadet Forces in the country, where students can choose between joining the Navy Section, Army Section or RAF Section. Also, the Alleyn's CCF offers JNCO CADRE, a leadership training programme, as well as visits to European Battlefields, military bases in England and Wales, and a recent arctic survival course in Northern Sweden. As well as the CCF, DofE is also offered, with students taking part in volunteering, skills based activities and a final expedition at the end of the year. Music and Drama also form a large part of life at Alleyn's with the Michael Croft Theatre (MCT) being a point of pride for the school's Drama department who put on shows there. The music at Alleyn's is equally distinguished, with performances at the Royal Festival Hall and at St John's, Smith Square, as well as music tours to Italy, France and Poland.

Heads of the school
1882–1902: Rev. J. Henry Smith (head of the Lower School at Dulwich, 1875–1882)
1919–1940:  R. B. Henderson
1945–1963: S. R. Hudson
1963–1966: Charles W. Lloyd
1967–1976: J. L. Fanner 
1976–1990: D. A. Fenner 
1992–2002: Dr Colin H. R. Niven
2010–2020: Dr Gary Savage 
2020: Mr Andy Skinnard
2021– : Jane Lunnon

Alleyn's Old Boys and Girls

School alumni are known as Alleyn Old Boys and Girls, or Alleyn's Old Boys and Girls. This should not be confused with Old Alleynians, the name of Dulwich College alumni.
 Felix Barrett, theatre director
 Stuart Blanch, Baron Blanch (1918–1994), Bishop of Liverpool, 1966–1975,; Archbishop of York, 1975–1983
 Nancy Carroll (born 1974), actress
 Jack Chalker (1918–2014), artist
 Ray Cooney (born 1932), playwright and actor
 Sir Henry Cotton (1907–1987), golfer
 Peter Darling, choreographer
 C. S. Forester (1899–1966), novelist
 Julian Glover (born 1935), actor
 Harry Guntrip (1901–1975), psychotherapist and Congregational minister
 Sir Joe Hooper (1914–1994), director, Government Communications Headquarters, 1965–1973; Government Intelligence Co-ordinator, 1973–1978
 Sir Michael Houghton, 2020 Nobel Prize in Physiology or Medicine laureate and co-discoverer of Hepatitis C
 Leslie Howard (1893–1943), actor, 1907–1910
 R. V. Jones (1911–1997), physicist, military intelligence expert; Professor of Natural Philosophy, University of Aberdeen, 1946–1981
 Baron Ajay Kakkar (born 1964), Professor of Surgical Science, St Bartholomew's Hospital, London (Roper's House; also a school governor)
 Jude Law (born 1972), actor
 Laurence Llewelyn-Bowen (born 1965), television presenter and architect
 Peter Lyons (1927-2006). Musician. Director of Music, Royal Naval College, Greenwich; Master of Choristers and Director of Music, Wells Cathedral and Wells Cathedral School; Headmaster, Witham Hall School<ref>Entry for Lyons, Peter Stanley, in Register of Twentieth Century Johnians, Volume I, 1900–1949nn. St John's College, Cambridge.</ref>
James Bolivar Manson (1879–1945), painter and director of Tate Gallery, 1930–1938
 Mitch McGugan, musician
 Jack Peñate (born 1984), singer-songwriter (Spurgeon's House)
 Sir V. S. Pritchett (1900–1997), writer and critic
Jacob Shaw (born 1988), cellist
 Mickey Stewart (born 1933), cricketer
 John Stride (1936–2018), actor
 Simon Ward (1941–2012), actor
 Hannah Ware (born 1982), model and actress, Boss Jessie Ware, singer, journalist
 Arthur Watson (1880–1969), editor, The Daily Telegraph'', 1924–1950
 Florence Welch (born 1986), vocalist and songwriter of Florence and the Machine (Spurgeon's House)
 Samuel West (born 1966), actor
 Felix White, guitarist and vocalist of The Maccabees
 Sir Frank George Young (1908–1988), biochemist; first Master of Darwin College, Cambridge, 1964–1976
 Tom Brooke
 The Chemical Brothers
 Cyrus Chothia
 Jonathan Clark (bishop)
 Donal Coonan
 Francis Cubbon
 Nicholas Day (actor)
 Mike Edwards (cricketer)
 Kenneth Farrington
 Rich Fownes
 Pixie Geldof
 Victor Groom
 Eddie Hardin
 Chris Harper (RAF officer)
 Michael Hastings (playwright)
 David Hemmings
 Terence Higgins, Baron Higgins
 Douglas Higgs
 Zezi Ifore
 Reginald Victor Jones
 Frederick Keeble
 Kelvin MacKenzie
 James Bolivar Manson
 Ben Preston
 John Pretlove
 Walter Pretty
 John Pullinger
 Colin Robbins (software engineer)
 Robin Shroot
 Kenneth Spring
 Dobrinka Tabakova
 Frank Thornton
 Cullum Welch
 David Weston (actor)
 Philip Woodfield
 Tilly Ramsay
 Louis Partridge
 Marc Bolan
Eden Cheng

Gallery

References

Bibliography

External links

 

1882 establishments in England
Church of England private schools in the Diocese of Southwark
College of God's Gift
Dulwich
Educational charities based in the United Kingdom
Educational institutions established in 1882
Private co-educational schools in London
Private schools in the London Borough of Southwark
Member schools of the Headmasters' and Headmistresses' Conference